Candie Sweetser (born November 17, 1962) is an American politician who served as a member of the New Mexico House of Representatives for the 32nd district from 2017 to 2023.

References

1962 births
Living people
Democratic Party members of the New Mexico House of Representatives
21st-century American politicians